The Earth System Science Partnership (ESSP) was a partnership under the auspices of the International Council for Science (ICSU) for the integrated study of the Earth system, the ways that it is changing, and the implications for global and regional sustainability. It included Diversitas, IGBP, the World Climate Research Program (WCRP) and IHDP. In 2012, the ESSP closed and begun its transition into Future Earth.

In the present era, global environmental changes are both accelerating and changing Earth's systems into a state with no analogue in previous history. The Earth System is the unified set of physical, chemical, biological and social components, processes and interactions that together determine the state and dynamics of planet Earth, including its biota and its human occupants.

Earth system science is the study of the Earth system, with an emphasis on observing, understanding and predicting global environmental changes involving interactions between land, atmosphere, water, ice, biosphere, societies, technologies and economies.

See also
Earth system science
International Geosphere-Biosphere Programme
Systems geology

References

External links
Earth System Science Partnership begins transition to Future Earth
Future Earth Initiative

International environmental organizations
Systems sciences organizations
Earth system sciences